The year 1998 was the 27th year after the independence of Bangladesh. It was also the third year of the first term of the Government of Sheikh Hasina.

Incumbents

 President: Shahabuddin Ahmed
 Prime Minister: Sheikh Hasina
 Chief Justice: A.T.M Afzal

Demography

Climate

Flood
From July to September 1998, Bangladesh suffered extensive flooding. Over 75% of the total area of the country was flooded, including half of Dhaka. It was similar to the catastrophic flood of 1988, in terms of the extent of the flooding. A combination of heavy rainfall within and outside the country and synchronisation of peak flows of the major rivers contributed to the flood. 30 million people were made homeless and the death toll reached over a thousand. The flooding caused contamination of crops and animals and unclean water resulted in cholera and typhoid outbreaks. Few hospitals were functional because of damage from the flooding, and those that were open had too many patients, resulting in everyday injuries becoming fatal due to lack of treatment. 700,000 hectares of crops were destroyed,

Economy

Note: For the year 1998 average official exchange rate for BDT was 46.91 per US$.

Events

23 June – Bangabandhu Bridge, the longest multipurpose bridge in Bangladesh, is inaugurated by the prime minister.
8 November – U.S. and now defunct energy company Unocal sign an agreement with Petrobangla to develop the country's largest gas field.
28 November – Floods devastate rice fields, pushing Bangladesh's annual food shortfall to 4.3 million tons. Over 1000 people reportedly died in the floods.

Awards and Recognitions

Independence Day Award

Ekushey Padak
 Ranesh Das Gupta (literature)
 Akhtaruzzaman Ilias (literature)
 Rokanuzzaman Khan (journalism)
 Abul Kashem Sandwip (journalism)
 Ferdousi Mazumder (drama)
 Mahbuba Rahman (music)

Sports
 Asian Games:
 Bangladesh participates in the 1998 Asian Games, held from 6 to 20 December 1998 in Bangkok, Thailand. The men's Kabbadi team won bronze medal in the respective event in the tournament.
 Cricket:
 Bangladesh hosts the 1998 ICC KnockOut Tournament (officially known as Wills International Cup). It is the first tournament apart from the World Cups to involve all test playing nations. South Africa defeated the West Indies in the final to win the event.
 In November, the West Indies A team visits Bangladesh and plays three List A matches against Bangladesh. Starting on 12 November the two teams play the first-ever first-class match in Bangladesh (i.e., since independence). West Indies A win by 8 wickets.

Births
 16 January – Masuk Mia Jony, footballer
 1 February – Zakir Hasan, cricketer
 22 February – Jaker Ali, cricketer
 22 May – Munim Shahriar, cricketer
 25 May – Nazmul Hossain Shanto, cricketer
 10 September – Hossain Ali, cricketer
 11 September – Robiul Islam, cricketer
 7 October – Yasir Arafat Mishu, cricketer
 15 October – Mosabbek Hossain, cricketer
 30 October – Saif Hassan, cricketer
 12 December – Towhid Hridoy, cricketer

Deaths

 26 January – Muhammad Sohrab Hossain, politician (b. 1922)
 14 February – Badrul Haider Chowdhury, Chief Justice of Bangladesh (b. 1925)
 14 May – Shawkat Osman, writer (b. 1917)
 1 June – Brojen Das, swimmer (b. 1927)
 12 August – Gazi Shamsur Rahman, lawyer, writer, translator, columnist and television personality (b. 1921).
 8 October – Jashim, film actor (b. 1950)
 30 November – Abdullah-Al-Muti, educationist (b. 1930)

See also 
 1990s in Bangladesh
 List of Bangladeshi films of 1998
 Timeline of Bangladeshi history

References